Risby may refer to:

Places
Risby, East Riding of Yorkshire, England
Risby, Lincolnshire, England
Risby, Suffolk, England

People
Andrew Risby
Marie Risby
Baron Risby
Richard Risby

See also
High Risby, North Lincolnshire, England
Low Risby, North Lincolnshire, England